The 1969 Georgia 500 was a NASCAR Grand National Series event that was held on November 9, 1969, at Middle Georgia Raceway in Byron, Georgia. An earlier race was run on November 1968 with the same name and year number.

The transition to purpose-built racecars began in the early 1960s and occurred gradually over that decade.  Changes made to the sport by the late 1960s brought an end to the "strictly stock" vehicles of the 1950s.

Race report
It took two hours and thirty-seven minutes to thoroughly complete 500 laps worth of racing.

LeeRoy Yarbrough quit for reasons unknown after just 64 laps; causing him to become the last-place finisher. Don Tarr's vehicle would develop problems with its water pump; relegating it to the garage on lap 126. Larry Baumel became the lowest-finishing driver who did not quit the race.

James Cox also quit the race, but only after competing in 131 laps. Don Biederman's vehicle developed issues with its clutch on lap 130 while the rear end of Dick Brooks' vehicle forced him to retire from the race on lap 210. A problematic axle would end Roy Mayne's day on the track on lap 221. Engine problems would claim Friday Hassler's vehicle on lap 236 and Johnny Halford's vehicle on lap 256.

A problematic clutch would take Elmo Langley out of the metaphorical equation on lap 288 while engine issues forced Ed Negre to retire on lap 291. E.J. Trivette would notice the rear end of his vehicle missing on lap 314 while Pete Hazelwood was black-flagged out the race on lap 366. Neil Castles would be forced to depart from the race due to engine troubles on lap 381.

Richard Petty had an engine problem and secure himself a sixth-place finish while Earl Brooks ended up more than 100 laps behind the lead lap drivers.

A NASCAR-following audience of ten thousand strong supporters ended up seeing Bobby Allison besting David Pearson by a distance of five stock car lengths. While David Pearson, Bobby Isaac and Richard Petty dominated the first 100 laps, the final 100 laps were monopolized by David Pearson and Bobby Allison. Six notable crew chiefs were recorded as participating in the event; including Dick Hutcherson, Dale Inman and Harry Hyde.

Don Biederman was the only Canadian in a field of 29 mostly American-born drivers. Individual post-race earnings for each driver ranged from the winner's share of $3,050 ($ when considering inflation) to the last-place finisher's share of $350 ($ when considering inflation). The total prize purse that was offered by the organizers was $19,075 ($ when considering inflation).

Qualifying

Finishing order
Section reference: 

 Bobby Allison (No. 22)
 David Pearson† (No. 17)
 Bobby Isaac† (No. 71)
 John Sears† (No. 4)
 Bill Champion† (No. 10)
 Richard Petty* (No. 43)
 Cecil Gordon† (No. 47)
 Ben Arnold (No. 76)
 Henley Gray (No. 19)
 James Hylton (No. 48)
 Bill Seifert (No. 45)
 Don Patton (No. 89)
 Jabe Thomas (No. 25)
 Wendell Scott† (No. 34)
 Earl Brooks† (No. 26)
 Neil Castles* (No. 06)
 Pete Hazelwood* (No. 12)
 E.J. Trivette* (No. 08)
 Ed Negre* (No. 8)
 Elmo Langley*† (No. 64)
 Johnny Halford* (No. 57)
 Friday Hassler*† (No. 39)
 Roy Mayne*† (No. 82)
 Dick Brooks*† (No. 32)
 Don Biederman*† (No. 70)
 James Cox* (No. 23)
 Don Tarr* (No. 0)
 Larry Baumel* (No. 68)
 LeeRoy Yarbrough*† (No. 98)

† signifies that the driver is known to be deceased 
* Driver failed to finish race

References

Georgia 500 (November 1969)
Georgia 500 (November 1969)
NASCAR races at Middle Georgia Raceway